The High Commission of The Bahamas in London is the diplomatic mission of The Bahamas in the United Kingdom. It was first established in the 1970s.

The present High Commissioner, Ellison E. Greenslade, QPM, is the ninth to hold the post. 

The building also serves as The Bahamas Tourist Office in London.

As well as functioning as the High Commission to the United Kingdom, it also serves as the Embassy of the Bahamas to a number of countries in Europe and a number of international organisations including the European Union, the Commonwealth Secretariat, the International Maritime Organization and the Bureau of International Expositions.

Gallery

References

External links
Official site

Bahamas
Diplomatic missions of the Bahamas
Bahamas–United Kingdom relations
Bahamas